Pionothele is a genus of African mygalomorph spiders in the family Pycnothelidae. It was first described by William Frederick Purcell in 1902.  it contains 2 species, found in Namibia and South Africa: P. gobabeb, and P. straminea. Originally placed with the Ctenizidae, it was transferred to the funnel-web trapdoor spiders in 1985, then to the Pycnothelidae in 2020.

See also
 List of Pycnothelidae species

References

Further reading

Mygalomorphae genera
Pycnothelidae
Spiders of South Africa